Caesar Williamson  was Dean of Cashel  from 1671 until 1675.

Williamson was educated at Westminster School, Trinity College, Cambridge,  Magdalen College, Oxford and Trinity College, Dublin. A noted author  he held livings at Wappenham, Ardstraw,  Dromiskin and Kilsaran from 1660. He was Treasurer of Christ Church Cathedral, Dublin from 1664 until 1671.

References 

Deans of Cashel
17th-century Irish Anglican priests
People educated at Westminster School, London
Alumni of Trinity College, Cambridge
Alumni of Magdalen College, Oxford
Alumni of Trinity College Dublin